Libuse Niklova (Libuše Niklová), née Kyselaková (1 April 1934 Zlín – 5 June 1981 Zlín) was a toy designer. Czech national treasure and world queen of toys. A world-renowned designer and innovator who created over 230 original toys, many of which were produced in many color variants. Well-known are her rubber figurines, accordion animals and inflatable toys. Her legendary work is represented in the collections of museums around the world, for example in collections of the Musée des Arts Décoratifs in Paris, the Museum of Modern Art in New York, the Victoria and Albert Museum in London, the National Museum of Modern Art in Tokyo, or in the Museum of Decorative Arts in Prague. In 2012, on the occasion of the annual Czech Grand Design Awards, she was the first female designer ever to be inducted into the Hall of Fame.

Life
She was born on April 1, 1934 in Zlín as Libuše Kyseláková. In the years 1949 to 1953, she studied, then a new field, the shaping of plastic materials at the Zdeněk Nejedlý State School of Applied Arts in Zlín and Uherské Hradiště, under the guidance of professors Luďěk Havelka and Jiří Jaška. After graduating in 1954, she joined the Gumotex factory in Břeclav, where she worked until 1964. In 1958, she married the painter František Nikl, a classmate from high school. In 1960, they had a son, the Czech painter, writer, and theater artist Petr Nikl, and in 1968 a daughter, Veronika. In 1961, she started working in Fatra Napajedla. In the course of her career, she obtained patents for nine inventions and three national industrial designs. She died prematurely on June 5, 1981 in Gottwaldov (Zlín). She designed accordion Tomcat or inflatable seating Buffalo and Giraffe. She sometimes designed the packaging for her toys.

Gumotex
At Gumotex Břeclav, where she worked after graduation, she mainly designed rubber squeaky toys. These were mainly figures and animals. They were first made from pressed and foam rubber, then from blown PVC, and in the 1960s, cast from PVC. Hand dyed with latex paints. She also created souvenir toys, made for example on the occasion of the 2nd Czechoslovak Spartakiad or the Brno Fairs and Exhibitions.

Fatra
After the birth of her son Peter, she worked in Fatra Napajedla from 1961 to 1980. Among her most famous creations are a black accordion tomcat, a ram, and a crocodile. When creating them, she was inspired by a bendable pipe from a „newly made flush tank“. She also designed the packaging in which the unassembled toy was sold. The child assembled it as a construction kit. She also designed toys for the smallest children, both inflatable and squeaky, which had very simple shapes. From the 1970s, she began designing larger inflatable and sit-on toys that were lightweight and washable. The Horse, the Rhinoceros, the Caterpillar, the Giraffe, the Lion, and the Polar Bear were among the followers of the Buffalo, whose prototype was created in 1971. Serial production began in 1973.

Genius
Libuše Niklová approached the toy as a whole, shaping a child’s personality. She was aware that the child learns, gets to know, and is educated through the toy. To top it all off, she elevated a functional object to art. Her toys had a nice shape, color, decor, unforgettable smell and sound. The toys could be used by children from one year of age without problems. The goal was to design a flexible, flexible, colorful toy that would immediately interest the child, and her toys fulfilled all of that. At the time, the toys were also very affordable.

Creations 
Libuše Niklová created over 230 original toys, many of which were produced in many color variants. Very few of her designs remained in the prototype stage. Her work was so brilliant that some of her toys were copied in more than 25 countries around the world, not only accordions but also rubber squeaky toys and inflatable toys as well.

Rubber squeaky toys
for Gumotex Břeclav in 1954-1964

Libuše Niklová designed 62 rubber toys, most of them squeaky, with the exception of a few dolls that do not have a squeaker. Many of these toys were also produced in several color variants. Hand-dyed with latex paints. She also designed a few toys as souvenirs, for example for the Spartakiad or Brno fairs and exhibitions.

Accordion toys
for Fatra Napajedla in 1963-1967

Libuše Niklová designed 12 accordion toys, 10 animals, a baby and a train called Toot-Toot. These toys were ingenious and revolutionary, so much that, according to our research, they were copied in at least 25 countries around the world, and tens of millions of children played with them. Libuše Niklová thus influenced not only the production of plastic toys all over the world, but affected the childhood of millions of people. Today, they are highly sought-after design gems.

Vernian toys
for Fatra Napajedla in 1966

Libuše Niklová designed 3 toys based on Jules Verne’s novels. Nautilus, Albatros and Epouvante. These toys were designed for Expo 1967 in Montreal, where they did not appear due to the previous regime for political reasons, they were said to be too Western. But eventually they got into production, although the Epouvante remained only as a prototype and was never mass-produced.

Inflatable toys
for Fatra Napajedla in 1963-1980

Libuše Niklová designed 140 inflatable toys. These inflatables were once again ingeniously designed, they were used both for playing in water and on land, some could also be used as children’s furniture or used for hopping. She also designed boats, sunbeds, water circles or pools. Some toys had sound.

Impact on the production of plastic toys in the world
Libuše Niklová designed 12 accordion toys, 10 animals, a baby and a Toot-Toot the train. In 1963, she applied for a patent (No. 115236) for a flexible plastic toy, the first of its kind in the world. These toys were so ingenious and revolutionary that, according to the research of researcher and collector Lukáš Toman, they were copied in at least 25 countries around the world. It can thus be said that tens of millions of children played with Libuše Niklová's toys, or more precisely with their almost identical copies. Libuše Niklová thus influenced not only the production of plastic toys all over the world, but affected the childhood of millions of people around the world. 
Researcher and collector Lukáš Toman presented his discoveries at the unique exhibition How a Tomcat Travelled the World. Libuše Niklová's Toys and Their Foreign Hybrids, which was held in the Museum of Decorative Arts in Prague from June 9 to October 2, 2022. The exhibition featured copies of Libuše Niklová's accordion toys from, for example, Poland, Austria, Hungary, Spain, but also for example from Taiwan, Hong Kong, Vietnam or also from Argentina or Israel.

Notable exhibitions 
Libuše Niklová’s work has been featured in various exhibitions for over 60 years.

- 2010 200 dm3 dechu (200 dm3 of breath) - the Regional Gallery of Fine Arts in Zlín, House of Arts in Zlín, Czech Republic
- 2010 200 dm3 dechu (200 dm3 of breath) - the Museum of Decorative Arts in Prague, Czech Republic
- 2011 Plastique ludique - the Musée des Arts Décoratifs in Louvre in Paris, France
- 2011 Paris et Création - Plastique ludique - the Galeries Lafayette in Paris, France
- 2012 Century of the Child: Growing by Design, 1900-2000 - the Museum of Modern Art in New York, USA
- 2013-2014 Designing Modern Women 1890-1990 - the Museum of Modern Art in New York, USA
- 2019 100 Years of Czech Design - the Okazaki Mindscape Museum,Okazaki City Museum of Art (Aichi) in Okazaki, Japan
- 2019 100 Years of Czech Design - the Toyama Prefectural Museum of Art and Design in Toyama, Japan
- 2019 100 Years of Czech Design - the Setagaya Art Museum in Tokyo, Japan
- 2020 100 Years of Czech Design - the Museum of Modern Art, Kamakura & Hayama in Hayama, Japan
- 2020 100 Years of Czech Design - the National Museum of Modern Art in Kyoto, Japan
- 2022 How a Tomcat Travelled the World: Libuše Niklová's Toys and Their Foreign Hybrids - the Museum of Decorative Arts in Prague, Czech Republic

References

1934 births
1981 deaths